The following discography for Gluck's opera Orfeo ed Euridice is mainly based on the research of Giuseppe Rossi, which appeared in the programme notes to the performance of the work at the 70th Maggio Musicale Fiorentino in 2007, under the title "Discografia – Christoph Willibald Gluck – Orfeo ed Euridice (Orphée et Eurydice)". Rossi's data has been checked against the sources referenced in the notes.

The discography gives the language of the recording as well as the version performed, although the recordings often mix different editions of the work or are even based on new ones created "from scratch." In the most significant cases, such mixed versions are described in detail. The term "pasticcio" (which has no negative connotation in this context) has been used for recordings where the different versions are inextricably mixed.

List

Complete recordings

Main partial recordings

References 
Notes

Sources
 Giudici, Elvio, L'opera in CD e video – Guida all'ascolto,  Milano, Il Saggiatore, 1995. 
 Jeremy Hayes, Gluck: Orphée et Eurydice – The 1774 Paris version, essay published in 2010 by Decca Records in the booklet enclosed to Jesús Lópes-Cobos's 2008 recording (CD)
 Patricia Howard (ed.), C.W. von Gluck: Orfeo, Cambridge/New York/Melbourne, Cambridge University Press, 1981 (consulted edition: series "Cambridge Opera Handbooks" (paperback), 2010)
 Arthur Hutchings, Gluck and Reform Opera, essay published in 1970 by Decca Records in the booklet enclosed to Sir Georg Solti's 1969 recording (LP)
 Sir Charles Mackerras, Berlioz: the best of both worlds, in P. Howard (ed.), C.W. von Gluck: Orfeo (op. cit., pp. 99–105)
 Carlo Manfriani and Sara Bertelli (eds.), 70th Maggio Musicale Fiorentino's Programme for the performances of Orfeo ed Euridice,  2007 (Bologna, Edizioni Pendragon. )
 Matteo Marazzi, Backstage: La discografia di Orfeo e Euridice,  «Opera Disc»
 Marinelli, Carlo ODE – Opera Discography Encyclopaedia   
 operadis-opera-discography.org
 Roberto Rossi, Discografia – Christoph Willibald Gluck – Orfeo ed Euridice (Orphée et Eurydice),  essay included in the 70th Maggio Musicale Fiorentino's Programme for the performances of Orfeo ed Euridice, 2007 (cf. above, C. Manfriani, pp. 60–71)

Opera discographies
Operas by Christoph Willibald Gluck